''Note: This working group has been disbanded.

ISO/IEC JTC 1/WG 7 Sensor Networks (WGSN) was a standardization working group of the joint technical committee ISO/IEC JTC 1 of the International Organization for Standardization (ISO) and the International Electrotechnical Commission (IEC), which develops and facilitates standards within the field of sensor networks. The international secretariat of ISO/IEC JTC 1/WG 7 is the Korean Agency for Technology and Standards (KATS), located in the Republic of Korea.

Maintenance of the standards was transferred to ISO/IEC JTC 1/SC 41.

History
ISO/IEC JTC 1/WG 7 was established in October 2009 via Resolution 34 of the 24th JTC 1 Plenary in Tel Aviv. The group was established with the intention of creating an ISO/IEC JTC 1 working group that would develop and facilitate the development of international standards for sensor networks. The working group is the successor of ISO/IEC JTC 1/SGSN, Study Group on Sensor Networks, which was established in 2007, at the 22nd JTC 1 Plenary. All standardization activities and members of ISO/IEC JTC 1/SGSN were transferred to ISO/IEC JTC 1/WG 7 after its establishment.

Terms of reference
The terms of reference for ISO/IEC JTC 1/WG 7 are:
 In the area of generic solutions for sensor networks, undertake standardization activities that support and can be applied to the technical work of all relevant JTC 1 entities and to other standards organizations. This includes activities in sensor networks such as the following:”
 Standardization of terminology
 Development of a taxonomy
 Standardization of reference architectures
 Development of guidelines for interoperability
 Standardization of specific aspects of sensor networks
 In the area of application – oriented sensor networks, identify gaps and commonalities that may impact standardization activities within the scope of JTC 1. Further, share this information with relevant entities within and outside of JTC 1. Unless better pursued within another JTC 1 entity, the following standardization activities may be pursued as projects by this Working Group:
 Addressing the technology gaps within the scope of JTC 1 entities
 Exploiting technology opportunities where it is desirable to provide common approaches to the use of sensor networks across application domains
 Addressing emerging areas related to M2M and IoT
 In order to foster communication and sharing of information between groups working in the field of sensor networks:
 Seek liaison relationships with all relevant SCs/WGs
 Seek liaison relationships with other organizations outside JTC 1
 Consider the possibility of conducting joint products with relevant ITU-T SGs
 Seek input from relevant research projects and consortia

Collaborations
ISO/IEC JTC 1/WG 7 works in close collaboration with a number of other organizations or subcommittees, both internal and external to ISO or IEC, in order to avoid conflicting or duplicative work. Organizations internal to ISO or IEC that collaborate with or are in liaison to ISO/IEC JTC 1/WG 7 include:
 ISO/IEC JTC 1/SC 6, Telecommunications and information exchange between systems
 ISO/IEC JTC 1/SC 25, Interconnection of information technology equipment
 ISO/IEC JTC 1/SC 27, IT security techniques
 ISO/IEC JTC 1/SC 31, Automatic identification and data capture techniques
 ISO/IEC JTC 1/SC 32, Data management and interchange
 ISO/IEC JTC 1/SC 36, Information technology for learning, education and training
 ISO/IEC JTC 1/SC 37, Biometrics
 ISO/TC 211, Geographic information/Geomatics
 IEC TC 65, Industrial-process measurement, control and automation
 IEC TC 100, Audio, video and multimedia systems and equipment

Some organizations external to ISO or IEC that collaborate with or are in liaison to ISO/IEC JTC 1/WG 7 include:
 IEEE TC 9, Instrumentation and Measurement Society
 Open Geospatial Consortium (OGC)

Member countries

The 9 members of ISO/IEC JTC 1/WG 7 are: Canada, China, France, Germany, Japan, Republic of Korea, Norway, United Kingdom, and United States.

Standards
ISO/IEC JTC 1/WG 7 currently has a number of standards published or under development within the field of sensor networks, including:

See also
 ISO/IEC JTC 1
 List of ISO standards
 Korean Agency for Technology and Standards
 International Organization for Standardization
 International Electrotechnical Commission

References

W